Silaghi is a Romanian surname, derived from the Hungarian Szilágyi. Notable people with the surname include:

Florica Silaghi (born 1957), Romanian rower
Ovidiu Ioan Silaghi (born 1962), Romanian politician
Valentin Silaghi (born 1957), Romanian boxer

Romanian-language surnames